Japinder Kaur is an Indian film director, producer, writer, painter and co-founder of JAP FILMS LLC in Dubai.

Early life and family 

Born to a Sikh business family, Kaur has one brother.

She married businessman Harpreet Singh Chadha in 2017.

Education 

Japinder was born in Dubai, and did her schooling from The Indian High School, Dubai with majors in Science with Computer Science. She graduated from Manipal University, Dubai with a specialization in Television Production. She continued her post graduation in Whistling Woods International Institute, Mumbai, and studied Film Direction there.

Career 

Japinder worked as a news reporter and producer for noted English TV channel City 7 TV in 2008. She then directed a short films and documentaries that did rounds at the film festivals all over the world.  Having assisted veteran directors such as Prakash Jha, Shashant Shah, Koushik Sarkar (Ad Filmmaker), she moved on to direct her first Bollywood feature film, Dilliwali Zaalim Girlfriend in 2013 under the banner Jap Films. 

In 2018, Japinder ventured into the fashion industry and started the brand SnK Couture (Singh and Kaur) in Toronto. The label specializes in handcrafted classic Cashmere and red carpet looks.

Filmography 
 Via Kargil (Short) – writer and director
 Aarakshan (Feature) – marketing team 
 Dilliwali Zaalim Girlfriend (Feature) – director
 ''Munda Faridkotia, Punjabi Indian Movie

References

Year of birth missing (living people)
Living people
People from Dubai
Indian emigrants to the United Arab Emirates
Indian expatriates in the United Arab Emirates
Indian Sikhs
Punjabi people
Indian film directors
Hindi-language film directors